The Torrington and Marland Railway was a  narrow gauge built to carry clay from the quarries at Clay Moor to Torrington in north Devon.

History 
The line was surveyed in 1879 by John Barraclough Fell who was also the consulting engineer to the nearby Pentewan Railway. Fell's survey was notable for its use of ten wooden viaducts, which were an unusual feature for a British railway.

The railway was a private line, built to serve clay traffic, but part of the agreement with the landowners over whose land it passed was that it would carry local passengers. Steam locomotives were used on both the main railway and the internal lines in the clay pits.

In 1925 the main line was replaced with a standard gauge branch of the North Devon and Cornwall Junction Light Railway. The Torrington and Marland was cut back to a 1½ mile stub and the internal quarry lines. These continued in use until 1971 when the line finally closed.

Locomotives

See also
 British narrow gauge railways
 Tarka Trail

References 

 The Torrington & Marland Light Railway - Rod Garner (Kestrel Railway Books)

3 ft gauge railways in England
Railway lines opened in 1880
Rail transport in Devon